Epicleas was an admiral from Sparta during the Peloponnesian War.

In 411 BC, the Spartans lost a fleet of 50 ships under the command of Epicleas. At the height of the Peloponnesian War, the Spartan fleet was caught in a violent storm while sailing past Mount Athos. Of the fifty ships only 12 men survived.

References 

Year of birth unknown
5th-century BC Spartans
Ancient Spartan admirals
Spartans of the Peloponnesian War